Microsoft Docs is the library of technical documentation for end users, developers, and IT professionals who work with Microsoft products. The Microsoft Docs website provides technical specifications, conceptual articles, tutorials, guides, API references, code samples and other information related to Microsoft software and web services. Microsoft Docs was introduced in 2016 as a replacement of MSDN and TechNet libraries which previously hosted some of these materials.

Structure and features 
The content on Microsoft Docs is organised into groups based on product or technology and steps of working with it: evaluating, getting started, planning, deploying, managing, and troubleshooting and the navigation panel and product/service pages show material breakdowns according to this principle. The service allows users to download specific docs section as a PDF file for offline use and includes an estimated reading time for every article.

Each article is represented as a Markdown file in various GitHub repositories and most of the documentation content is open-sourced and accepts pull requests. Microsoft released a set of Visual Studio Code extensions, Docs Authoring Pack, to assist in editing Microsoft Docs content. It includes the support of Docs-specific markdown features.

History 
Microsoft Docs preview was introduced in June 2016, initially containing .NET documentation. The process of migrating the bulk of MSDN and TechNet libraries' content have taken approximately two years. Key events:

 November 2016: the documentation for Azure, Visual Studio 2017 RC, C++, ASP.NET Core, Entity Framework Core and SQL on Linux was added.
 September 2017: the documentation for Office SharePoint, Windows 10, Windows Server 2016, and BizTalk Server ITPro was migrated from MSDN/TechNet.
 February 2018: Microsoft added new feedback system for Docs based on GitHub issues.
 September 2018: The launch of Microsoft Learn was announced on Microsoft Docs.
 November 2018: OneDrive technical documentation moved from TechNet to Microsoft Docs.
 September 2022: The technical documentation from Microsoft Docs was made an item on the Microsoft Learn site.

See also

 Microsoft Developer Network
 Microsoft TechNet

References

External links
Technical docunentation - Microsoft Learn
Docs Authoring Pack

Microsoft

Microsoft websites

Software documentation